Epermenia chaerophyllella, also known as the garden lance-wing, is a moth of the family Epermeniidae first described by Johann August Ephraim Goeze in 1783. It is found in all of Europe and Asia Minor.

Description
Moths can be found in all months of the year. They are most abundant from October to May and in July and August. The wingspan is 12–14 mm. Adults are variable in colour, but consisting of a mixture of blackish, chestnut and white. There are two to three generations per year with the last generation of adults overwintering. Epermenia aequidentellus looks similar, but has narrower forewings without a hooked apex.

Ova
Eggs are laid between April and September on the underside of a mature leaf of a plant from the Umbelliferae family, often near the edge.

Larva
Early instar larvae mine the leaves of their host plant which has the form of a short, sometimes widened corridor. There are mostly multiple mines in a single leaf and a single larva makes a number of mines. Older larvae live free and cause window feeding and are often found in a group under a light spinning. Larvae can be found from May to June and again from August to September. The body sometimes appear translucent and can be glossy white, yellow or greenish, with black or brown spots and a whitish dorsal line. The head is pale brown. There are five instars. Larva of Epermenia aequidentellus found on wild carrot (Daucus carota) have a dark dorsal line and a black head. 

The larvae feed on various Apiaceae species, including ground elder (Aegopodium podagraria), garden angelica (Angelica archangelica litoralis), angelica (Angelica sylvestris), bur-chervil (Anthriscus caucalis), chervil (Anthriscus cerefolium), cow parsley (Anthriscus sylvestris), celery (Apium graveolens), lesser water-parsnip (Berula erecta), caraway (Carum carvi), Chaerophyllum hirsutum, rough chervil (Chaerophyllum temulum), cowbane (Cicuta virosa), hemlock (Conium maculatum), wild carrot (Daucus carota), giant hogweed (Heracleum mantegazzianum), hogweed (Heracleum sphondylium), lovage (Levisticum officinale), water dropwort (Oenanthe species), parsnip (Pastinaca sativa), Peucedanum species, burnet-saxifrage (Pimpinella saxifraga), moon carrot (Seseli libanotis), Silaum species, Sison amomum, great water-parsnip (Sium latifolium) and hedge parsleys (Torilis species).

Pupa
The light brown pupa is in an open network cocoon and is normally found in detritus on the ground or occasionally on the leaf, or in a petiole groove.

References

Epermeniidae
Leaf miners
Moths described in 1783
Moths of Asia
Moths of Europe
Taxa named by Johann August Ephraim Goeze